Glacies alpinata is a moth of the family Geometridae. It was described by Scopoli in 1763. It is found in Alps, the Czech Republic, Poland, Romania and Slovakia.

Adults are on wing from June to September and are day active.

The larva feeds on the leaves of various low-growing plants.

References

External links

 Lepiforum.de
 schmetterlinge-deutschlands.de

Gnophini
Moths described in 1763
Moths of Europe
Taxa named by Giovanni Antonio Scopoli